Cetancodontamorpha is a total clade of artiodactyls defined, according to Spaulding et al., as Whippomorpha "plus all extinct taxa more closely related to extant members of Whippomorpha than to any other living species". Attempts have been made to rename the clade Whippomorpha to Cetancodonta, but the former maintains precedent.

Whippomorpha is the crown clade containing Cetacea (whales, dolphins, etc.) and hippopotamuses. According to Spaulding et al., members of the whippomorph stem group (i.e., "stem-whippomorphs") include such taxa as the family Entelodontidae and the genus Andrewsarchus.

References

 
Cetruminantia
Phylogenetics
Taxa described in 2009